Tongdao (the full name: "Tongdao Dong Autonomous County", ;  usually referred to as "Tongdao County") is an autonomous county of Dong people in Hunan Province, China, it is under the administration of the prefecture-level city of Huaihua. Tongdao is also the 5th least-populous county of the province (after Shaoshan, Guzhang, Shuangpai and Yanling).

Located on the south western corner of Hunan province, Tongdao borders Guizhou to the west and Guangxi to the south. The county lies in the southernmost part of Huaihua, it is the least populous and least densely populated county-level division of Huaihua. Tongdao borders to the northwest by Jingzhou County, to the northeast by Suining and Chengbu Counties, to the southeast and the south by Longsheng and Sanjiang Counties of Guangxi, to the west by Liping County of Guizhou. The county has 8 towns and 3 townships under its jurisdiction, the county seat is Shuangjiang Town.

There are two Miao subgroups in Tongdao County, namely Hua Miao ( mjiu55 ken35) and Cao Miao ( mjiu55). Despite being officially classified by the Chinese government as ethnic Miao, Cao Miao is actually a Kam-Sui language.

Climate

References

External links 
 www.xzqh.org 

 
County-level divisions of Hunan
Kam autonomous counties